2014 Regional League Division 2 North Eastern Region is the 6th season of the League competition since its establishment in 2009. It is in the third tier of the Thai football league system. The league winners and runners up will qualify for the 2014 Regional League Division 2 championship stage.

Changes from Last Season

Team Changes

Promoted Clubs

Roi Et United were promoted to the 2014 Thai Division 1 League.

Withdrawn Clubs

Yasothon United have withdrawn from the 2014 campaign.

Renamed Clubs

 Amnat Poly United renamed Amnat Charoen Town.

Stadium and locations

League table

References

External links
 Football Association of Thailand

Regional League North-East Division seasons